Gardiner Airport  is a public use airport located two nautical miles (3.7 km) northwest of the central business district of Gardiner, a city in Park County, Montana, United States. The airport is owned by the city and county.

Facilities and aircraft 
It has one asphalt paved runway designated 10/28 which measures 3,200 by 55 feet (975 x 17 m).

For the 12-month period ending August 31, 2004, the airport had 8,600 aircraft operations, an average of 23 per day: 93% general aviation and 7% air taxi. At that time there were 9 aircraft based at this airport, all single-engine.

References

External links 
 

Airports in Montana
Buildings and structures in Park County, Montana
Transportation in Park County, Montana